3,3-Diphenylpropylamine is a form of diphenylpropylamine. 

It is commonly conjugated to another agent giving a "bifunctional" molecule. Such agents are not infrequently used to treat Cardiovascular disease (CVD).

Further embellishment of the molecular structure can lead to an agent that is called Delucemine.

References

Amines